The Kings Head Pub is a  grade II listed pub in the conservation area of West Tilbury. The pub closed in 2015 and in May 2016 Punch Taverns sold the pub, as part of their corporate strategy, to housing developers.

An Asset of Community Value order has been placed on The Kings Head by Thurrock Council, offering protection against any housing development.

Architecture and History
The Kings Head has been listed Grade II on the National Heritage List for England since November 1981.

References

External links
The Community Pub Site
West Tilbury Village Hall

18th-century establishments in England
Grade II listed pubs in Essex
West Tilbury
Pubs in Essex